Euhadenoecus insolitus, the mccluney cave cricket, is a species of camel cricket in the family Rhaphidophoridae. It is found in North America. E. insolitus regularly forage outside their cave habitat except in the winter. Different populations are reproduce either through sexual reproduction or parthenogenesis.

References

Rhaphidophoridae
Articles created by Qbugbot
Insects described in 1978
Orthoptera of North America
Cave insects